This is a list of properties and districts in Dougherty County, Georgia that are listed on the National Register of Historic Places (NRHP).

Current listings

|}

References

Dougherty
Buildings and structures in Dougherty County, Georgia